The Eritrean War of Independence was a war for independence which Eritrean independence fighters waged against successive Ethiopian governments from 1 September 1961 to 24 May 1991.

Eritrea was an Italian colony from the 1880s until the defeat of the Italians by the Allies of World War II in 1941, Eritrea then briefly became a British protectorate until 1951. The General Assembly of the United Nations held a meeting about the fate of Eritrea, in which the majority of the delegates voted for the federation of Eritrea with Ethiopia, and Eritrea became a constituent state of the Federation of Ethiopia and Eritrea in 1952. The Federation was supposed to last for ten years in which Eritreans could have mini sovereign decisions such as a parliament and some autonomy, but under the Ethiopian crown for further ones. The Assembly also assigned commissioner Anzio Mattienzo to supervise the process. Eritreans were supposed to claim Eritrea as an independent sovereign state after the ten years of federation. However, Eritrea's declining autonomy and growing discontent with Ethiopian rule caused an independence movement led by the Eritrean Liberation Front (ELF) in 1961. Hamid Idris Awate officially began the Eritrean armed struggle for independence on 1 September 1961 on the mountain of Adal, near the town of Agordat in south western Eritrea. Ethiopia annexed Eritrea the next year.

Following the Ethiopian Revolution in 1974, the Derg abolished the Ethiopian Empire and established a Marxist-Leninist communist state. The Derg enjoyed support from the Soviet Union and other communist nations in fighting against the Eritreans. The ELF was supported diplomatically and militarily by various countries, particularly the People's Republic of China, which supplied the ELF with weapons and training until 1972, when Ethiopia recognized Beijing as the legitimate government of China.

The Eritrean People's Liberation Front (EPLF) became the main liberation group in 1977, expelling the ELF from Eritrea, then exploiting the Ogaden War to launch a war of attrition against Ethiopia. The Ethiopian government under the Workers Party of Ethiopia lost Soviet support at the end of the 1980s and were overwhelmed by Ethiopian anti-government groups, allowing the EPLF to defeat Ethiopian forces in Eritrea in May 1991.

The Ethiopian People's Revolutionary Democratic Front (EPRDF), with the help of the EPLF, defeated the People's Democratic Republic of Ethiopia (PDRE) when it took control of the capital Addis Ababa a month later. In April 1993, the Eritrean people voted almost unanimously in favour of independence in the Eritrean independence referendum, with formal international recognition of an independent, sovereign Eritrea in the same year.

Background 
The Italians colonised Eritrea in 1882 and ruled it until 1941. In 1936, Italy invaded Ethiopia and declared it part of their colonial empire, which they called Italian East Africa. Italian Somaliland and Eritrea were also part of that entity, ruled by a Governor-General or Viceroy.

Conquered by the Allies in 1941, Italian East Africa was sub-divided. Ethiopia liberated its formerly Italian occupied land in 1941.  Italian Somaliland remained under Italian rule, but as a United Nations protectorate not a colony, until 1960 when it united with British Somaliland, to form the independent state of Somalia.

Eritrea was made a British protectorate from the end of World War II until 1951. However, there was debate as to what should happen with Eritrea after the British left. The British delegation to the United Nations proposed that Eritrea be divided along religious lines with the Christians to Ethiopia and the Muslims to Sudan. In 1952, the United Nations decided to federate Eritrea to Ethiopia, hoping to reconcile Ethiopian claims of sovereignty and Eritrean aspirations for independence. About nine years later, Ethiopian Emperor Haile Selassie dissolved the federation and annexed Eritrea, triggering a thirty-year armed struggle in Eritrea.

Revolution 
During the 1960s, the Eritrean independence struggle was led by the Eritrean Liberation Front (ELF). The independence struggle can properly be understood as the resistance to the annexation of Eritrea by Ethiopia long after the Italians left the territory. Additionally, one may consider the actions of the Ethiopian Monarchy against Muslims in the Eritrean government as a contributing factor to the revolution. At first, this group factionalized the liberation movement along ethnic and geographic lines. The initial four zonal commands of the ELF were all lowland areas and primarily Muslim. Few Christians joined the organization in the beginning, fearing Muslim domination.

After growing disenfranchisement with Ethiopian occupation, highland Christians began joining the ELF. This growing influx of Christian volunteers prompted the opening of the fifth (highland Christian) command. Internal struggles within the ELF command coupled with sectarian violence among the various zonal groups splintered the organization.

The war started on 1 September 1961 with the Battle of Adal, when Hamid Idris Awate and his companions engaged the occupying Ethiopian Army and police. In 1962, Emperor Haile Selassie unilaterally dissolved the federation and the Eritrean parliament and annexed the country.

War (1961–1991)

1960s
The Eritrean Liberation Front (ELF), was founded in 1961 by a handful of exiled Eritreans, began guerrilla operations against the Imperial Government in the fashion of the traditional bandits of that province. By 1966, it had a free hand in much of the barren lowlands in western and coastal Eritrea. The movement enjoyed military aid from various Arab countries as virtually all of its leaders were Muslims. However, the leadership of the ELF was often inept; and communications between roving guerrilla bands and the exiled leaders were sporadic at best. Nonetheless, it was able to infiltrate small arms and returning trainees by way of Sudan and the Red Sea coast, and harass Imperial forces in Eritrea. The ELF was mostly made up of Muslim tribes such as the Tigre, Saho and Nara.

The Imperial Ethiopian Army, whose Second Division was based in Eritrea, made periodic sweeps through the countryside. The Israeli trained commando police were more efficient than the army. But the commando police was too few in number to protect important installations and also pursue the insurgents. And the Second Division was heavily resented by the Eritrean populace and was not very effective. Its normal tactics were to burn down villages, arrest suspects, and destroy livestock—the traditional Ethiopian responses to dissidence.

1970s

In 1970 members of the ELF had a falling out, and several different groups broke away from the group. During this time, the ELF and the groups that later joined to form the Eritrean People's Liberation Front (EPLF) fought a bitter civil war. The two organizations were forced by popular will to reconcile in 1975 and participated in joint operations against Ethiopia.

In 1974, Emperor Haile Selassie was ousted in a coup. The new Ethiopian government, called the Derg, was a Marxist military junta, which eventually came to be controlled by strongman Mengistu Haile Mariam. The new Derg regime took an additional three to four years to get complete control of both Ethiopia, Eritrea, and parts of Somalia. After this change of government, followed by international recognition, Ethiopia began a strategic alliance with the Soviet Union.

Many of the groups that splintered from the ELF joined in 1977 and formed the EPLF. By the late 1970s, the EPLF had become the dominant armed Eritrean group fighting against the Ethiopian government. The leader of the umbrella organization was Secretary-General of the EPLF Ramadan Mohammed Nour, while the Assistant Secretary-General was Isaias Afewerki.

During this time, the Derg could not control the population by force alone. To supplement its garrisons, forces were sent on missions to instill fear in the population, including massacres which took place in primarily Muslim parts of Eritrea, including the villages of She'eb, Hirgigo, Elabared, and the town of Om Hajer; massacres also took place in predominately Christian areas as well. The advent of these brutal killings of civilians regardless of race, religion, or class was the final straw for many Eritreans who were not involved in the war, and at this point many either fled the country or went to the front lines.

From 1975 to 1977, the ELF and EPLF outnumbered the Ethiopian army and liberated all of Eritrea except Asmara, Massawa, and Barentu. By 1977, the EPLF was poised to drive the Ethiopians out of Eritrea, by utilizing a simultaneous military invasion from the east by Somalia in the Ogaden to siphon off Ethiopian military resources. But in a dramatic turnaround, the Derg managed to repulse the Somali incursion, thanks mainly to a massive airlift of Soviet arms. After that, using the considerable manpower and military hardware available from the Somali campaign, the Ethiopian Army regained the initiative and forced the EPLF to retreat. This was most notable in the Battle of Barentu and the Battle of Massawa.

In May 1978, using a newly completed airfield in Mekelle in neighboring Tigray, the Ethiopian air force began a campaign of saturation bombing of positions in Eritrea held by the ELF and EPLF. While many of the targets hit were military, the bombers also attacked towns, villages and animal herds. The ground offensive started in July, and in a few weeks captured all the towns that the ELF and EPLF had held in southern and central Eritrea.  The second offensive began in November 1978, aimed at the relief of Massawa and the recapture of Keren. An even larger army was deployed, including large contingents of armor. On November 25–26, there was a huge two-day battle with the EPLF at Elabored, which ended inconclusively. However, the EPLF was badly mauled and decided to abandon Keren and the nearby towns, and withdraw to the mountains of Sahel, where the terrain was appropriate for a last stand. This was called the "strategic withdrawal." The ELF, which had taken the brunt of the first offensive, refused to pull out of the newly liberated areas. By continuing to engage the Ethiopian army, rather than retreat, the ELF ensured its military defeat.

The third offensive took place in January–February 1979, and consisted in a three- pronged attack on Nakfa, the headquarters of Sahel district, where the EPLF had set up its "liberated area" and was beginning to construct defensive lines. More areas were evacuated in the face of the assault, and the EPLF was able to dismantle and remove the infrastructure more systematically.

The fourth offensive was launched towards Nafka in March 1979, the fifth offensive was then launched in July. The army Chief of Staff wrote a newspaper article anticipating total victory, entitled: "Days of remnants of secessionist bandits lurking in bushes numbered." Over 50,000 troops were deployed in the attacks, together with large amounts of armor. Most of the attacks were destroyed well short of their target. Between July 14 and 22, the army lost an estimated 6,000
dead while the guerrillas lost around 2,500.

Another offensive, launched towards Nakfa in December 1979, ended in a disaster and rout for government forces. The EPLF was able to counter-attack and push the army back as far as its headquarters at Afabet.

1980s
In December 1980 the government launched a relatively small attack, which petered out without military gains to either side. 1981 passed without a major military offensive.

The alliance between the EPLF and the ELF which had held since 1975 began to break, and quickly developed into an irrevocable split. There were some armed clashes between the groups, for instance in August 1980, but large-scale civil war was avoided in part because of military weakness of the ELF. The Tigray People's Liberation Front (TPLF) assisted the EPLF in its attacks on ELF positions. Most of the ELF fighters retreated into Sudan, where they were detained and disarmed by the Sudanese government. The last major group arrived in Karakon, eastern Sudan, in 1981.

After the comparative lull of 1980–1, 1982 was to be the worst year of war in Eritrea to date, in which the government made an all-out attempt to crush the EPLF. It was named the Red Star Campaign in response to the planned US "Bright Star" exercises in the Middle East. Mengistu Haile Mariam then went to Asmara to personally oversee the offensive himself. The Red Star Campaign involved the largest number of troops ever deployed in Eritrea—more than 120,000 were involved in the attacks on the EPLF base areas. The forcefully conscripted soldiers in the Ethiopian ranks were used for massive assaults on the EPLF positions around Nakfa, in the hope that sheer weight of numbers would overrun the rebel lines. The offensive involved an unprecedented use of air power and toxic gas. The EPLF had to equip it's fighters with homemade gas masks. Despite inflicting devastating casualties on the EPLF, the Ethiopians failed to breakthrough the rebel lines. The Red Star offensive failed. By May 1982, it had failed to capture Nafka, and it was unofficially abandoned on June 20. The EPLF was even able to counter-attack and push government lines back. Having been launched with huge publicity, the offensive ended in complete silence from the government media.

In 1983, the government launched an offensive in March on the Halhal front, north of Keren. Known as the "Stealth Offensive" because of the lack of publicity surrounding it, government forces succeeded in overrunning EPLF lines, but not in inflicting a significant defeat on the rebels.

In early 1984, the EPLF went on the offensive, making some significant gains. The government responded by another round of aerial bombardment, and by an offensive launched on 27 October which inflicted heavy casualties on the Eritreans and forced them to retreat back to their original lines.

In the summer of 1985, the EPLF again went on the offensive and expelled the Ethiopians from the town of Barentu. The Derg then sent freshly conscripted recruits and threw them at the entrenched Eritreans to force them out of Barentu, the result was a costly victory for the Ethiopians as they were able to push out the Eritreans but not after talking significant casualties.

In 1986 the Derg launched the “Red Sea Offensive” and attacked the frontlines of the EPLF with the aim of capturing Nafka, despite extensive air support and the use of airborne troops in the Sahel the Ethiopians were repelled. As insurgencies in Tigray, Wollo and other parts of Ethiopia began to grow worse the government no longer had the resources to conduct massive offensives in Eritrea and had to focus on other regions as well.

In 1988, with the Battle of Afabet, the EPLF captured Afabet and its surroundings, then headquarters of the Ethiopian Army in northeastern Eritrea, prompting the Ethiopian Army to withdraw from its garrisons in Tessenei, Barentu and Agordat leaving all of western and northern Eritrea into EPLF hands. EPLF fighters then moved into position around Keren, Eritrea's second-largest city.

1990s
The Soviet Union informed Mengistu that it would not be renewing its defence and cooperation agreement. With the cessation of Soviet support and supplies, the Ethiopian Army's morale plummeted, and the EPLF, along with other Ethiopian rebel forces, began to advance on Ethiopian positions.

In February 1990, the EPLF launched Operation Fenkil to capture the city of Massawa. The Ethiopian garrison initially put up fierce resistance until the EPLF used naval units to flak the Ethiopians. The Eritreans were able to overcome the Ethiopian defences and capture the city. After Massawa was captured by the EPLF the government launched a devastating air raid on the city with the use of cluster bombs killing hundreds of civilians.

In 1991, the Ethiopian People's Revolutionary Democratic Front (EPRDF) had begun advancing towards the capital forcing Mengistu Haile Mariam to flee the country. By May 1991, the rebels had captured Addis Ababa and overthrew the government. Around the same time, the Ethiopian garrison in Asmara withdrew allowing the EPLF fighters to enter the city. The last battle took place on May 25 in Assab, when the EPLF defeated the last remnants of government loyalists.

Peace talks
The former President of the United States, Jimmy Carter, with the help of some U.S. government officials and United Nations officials, attempted to mediate in peace talks with the EPLF, hosted by the Carter Presidential Center in Atlanta, Georgia in September 1989. Ashagre Yigletu, Deputy Prime Minister of the People's Democratic Republic of Ethiopia (PDRE), helped negotiate and signed a November 1989 peace deal with the EPLF in Nairobi, along with Jimmy Carter and Al-Amin Mohamed Seid. However, soon after the deal was signed, hostilities resumed. Yigletu also led the Ethiopian government delegations in peace talks with the TPLF leader Meles Zenawi in November 1989 and March 1990 in Rome. He also attempted again to lead the Ethiopian delegation in peace talks with the EPLF in Washington, D.C. until March 1991.

Recognition 

After the end of the Cold War, the United States played a facilitative role in the peace talks in Washington, D.C. during the months leading up to the May 1991 fall of the Mengistu regime. In mid-May, Mengistu resigned as head of the Ethiopian government and went into exile in Zimbabwe, leaving a caretaker government in Addis Ababa. A high-level U.S. delegation was present in Addis Ababa for the 1–5 July 1991 conference that established a transitional government in Ethiopia. Having defeated the Ethiopian forces in Eritrea, the EPLF attended as an observer and held talks with the new transitional government regarding Eritrea's relationship to Ethiopia. The outcome of those talks was an agreement in which the Ethiopians recognized the right of the Eritreans to hold a referendum on independence. The referendum was held in April 1993 and the Eritrean people voted almost unanimously in favour of independence, with the integrity of the referendum being verified by the UN Observer Mission to Verify the Referendum in Eritrea (UNOVER). On 28 May 1993, the United Nations formally admitted Eritrea to its membership. Below are the results from the referendum:

See also 

 Eritrean Civil Wars
 List of massacres committed during the Eritrean War of Independence

References

Notes

Bibliography 

 
 
 
 Charles G. Thomas and Toyin Falola. 2020. "The Anomaly of Eritrean Secession, 1961-1993." in Secession and Separatist Conflicts in Postcolonial Africa. University of Calgary Press.

Further reading 

 Country profile: Eritrea BBC 4 November 2005
 Ethiopia Eritrea Independence War 1961–1993
 Eritrean War for Independence

 
Eritrea–Ethiopia military relations
Separatism in Ethiopia
Separatist rebellion-based civil wars
20th century in Eritrea
Wars involving Libya
Wars involving Cuba
Wars involving Ethiopia
Wars involving the Soviet Union
Wars involving Eritrea
Wars involving the states and peoples of Africa
Wars involving the United States
Proxy wars
20th-century military history
Military history of Eritrea
Military history of Ethiopia
Wars of independence